Buffalo Gal Pictures is an independent TV and film production company based in Winnipeg, Manitoba, Canada. 

The company has produced 20 feature films, 10 television dramas, 8 documentaries, and over 50 hours of television series. In 2004, it premiered the Isabella Rossellini film The Saddest Music in the World at the Sundance Film Festival.

In 2013, Buffalo Gal Pictures produced Seances, a lost film project by Guy Maddin, in co-production with the National Film Board of Canada.

Its subsidiaries include Insidious Pictures, which focuses on horror; and Kistikan Pictures Inc., dedicated to Indigenous content for film and television, in partnership with actress Tina Keeper.

The company was named "Buffalo Gal" to represent Manitoba, as well as symbolizing the western with a feminine touch.

Filmography

Television
 2002. 2030 CE
 2008–2013. Less Than Kind, seasons 1–4
 2009–2014. Cashing In (Kistikan Pictures)
 2014–2015. The Pinkertons
 2015. Sunnyside

Film
2003. The Saddest Music in the World
2004. Seven Times Lucky
2005. Niagara Motel
2007. My Winnipeg
2007. The Stone Angel
2009. Amreeka
2009. High Life
2010. Locked Down
2010. How to Start Your Own Country
2011. The Year Dolly Parton Was My Mom
2012. ATM
2012. Mad Ship
2012. Silent Night (Insidious Pictures)
2013. All the Wrong Reasons
2014. Burt’s Buzz
2014. Aloft
2014. Heaven Is for Real
2015. The Forbidden Room
2015. Hyena Road
2015. Borealis
2016. Soul Sisters — documentary for VisionTV
2016. You're Killing Me Susana
2018. JT LeRoy
2018. Night Hunter
2018. Siberia
2018. Road of Iniquity (Kistikan Pictures)
2021. Seance

Awards

References

External links
Official site

Companies based in Winnipeg
Television production companies of Canada
Cinema of Manitoba
Film production companies of Canada